Milan Vuković (Serbian Cyrillic: Милан Вуковић; born 28 April 1988) is a footballer from Serbia playing currently for SKU Amstetten.

External links
 Profile at iDNES.cz
 

1988 births
Living people
Serbian footballers
Association football forwards
Serbian expatriate footballers
SK Slavia Prague players
FK Dukla Banská Bystrica players
FK Jablonec players
SK Kladno players
FC Sellier & Bellot Vlašim players
FC Petržalka players
Slovak Super Liga players
Czech First League players
Expatriate footballers in the Czech Republic
Expatriate footballers in Slovakia
Expatriate footballers in Germany
Expatriate footballers in Austria
SKU Amstetten players
Serbian expatriate sportspeople in Germany
Serbian expatriate sportspeople in the Czech Republic
Serbian expatriate sportspeople in Slovakia
Footballers from Belgrade
Bonner SC players